Evechinus is a genus of echinoderms belonging to the family Echinometridae.

The species of this genus are found in New Zealand and Australia.

Species
Species:

Fossils
  Evechinus palatus

References

Echinometridae
Echinoidea genera